Endeavour Foundation is a not-for-profit charity headquartered in Brisbane, Queensland, Australia. It is one of the largest disability service providers in Australia, employing over 1800 staff and supported by 1200 volunteers.

The organisation was established in Queensland in 1951 to support children with an intellectual disability. Endeavour Foundation now supports over 4,000 people with a disability across Queensland, New South Wales and Victoria to live active and fulfilling lives at home, to find employment compatible with their abilities and to engage more broadly within the community.

Endeavour Foundation continues to advocate, innovate and push the boundaries for its customers, encouraging them to live their lives to the full and working closely with them to help make their possibilities a reality.

In 2014, the Endeavour Foundation was a recipient of the Queensland Greats Awards.

History
Endeavour Foundation was founded in 1951 by a group of parents of children with an intellectual disability. Initially called the Queensland Sub-Normal Children's Welfare Association, the group's ambition was to establish training centres to teach the children to do simple unskilled work. The group received the patronage of Sir Fred Schonell, the first Professor of Education and later Vice-Chancellor of the University of Queensland. Schonell was Endeavour Foundation's first President and extended his research interest in education for people with a disability by creating the Remedial Education Centre (now known as the Fred and Eleanor Schonell Special Education Research Centre), one of the first of its kind in the world.

In its first two years of operation, the organisation registered 300 children with an intellectual disability. The Association's first school and support group were established in a member's home. In June 1953, the association established its first centre in Coorparoo in Brisbane with a teacher to provide basic education to the children, putting into practice ideas developed at the University of Queensland. By 1954, the Association had grown beyond Brisbane, with the formation of the first regional sub-committees in Toowoomba and Ipswich. In 1955, the centre moved to a large property in Bowen Hills in Brisbane.

Endeavour Foundation's Head Office, one regional office and a non-vocational day service were previously based at the location, now known as Schonell House in Jordan Terrace, which was sold to property developer BMI Group in the late 2000s and has since been on sold.

The organisation continued to expand rapidly, opening its first service for adults – a workshop in Bowen Hills, and its first accommodation service in Toowoomba in 1964.

In 1982, the Association voted to enact a change of name from the Queensland Sub-Normal Children's Welfare Association to Endeavour Foundation, reflecting a change in societal attitudes towards people with a disability and the organisation's growth.

By 1984, Endeavour Foundation had grown to provide services to more than 3,500 people in 19 non-vocational day services for adults, 25 schools, 12 workshops, 6 farms, 34 adult residential homes, 24 group homes, and 13 clinics across the state. In 1986, the provision of education to children was taken over by the Queensland Department of Education, and Endeavour Foundation's focus moved to support for adults.

Through the 1980s and 1990s, Endeavour Foundation continued to grow, despite recognition that the organisation was losing thousands of dollars per week through the provision of services to people without individualised funding packages by the Queensland Government. This resulted in the shedding of major property assets by the organisation, and the movement and closure of some services.

Currently, Endeavour Foundation's services are divided among four geographical areas. These areas are: Queensland North (incorporating Far North Queensland down to Bundaberg), Queensland South (Hervey Bay down to Caloundra and out to Stanthorpe), Queensland Metro (from Moreton down to the Gold Coast and west to Gatton, including Brisbane), and New South Wales/Victoria. The organisation is managed by chief executive officer Andrew Donne and senior management, guided by an elected Board of Directors.

Endeavour Foundation has ten Area Committees made up of Endeavour Foundation members. The committees provide feedback on policy and services, build community links and vote on elected members of the Board.

In September 2009, Endeavour Foundation acquired Cumberland Industries in Western Sydney, providing employment for a further 610 people with a disability, making Endeavour Foundation the largest non-government provider of direct disability employment in Australia.

In 2013, Endeavour Foundation opened a $3.8 million fully accredited food packaging facility in the Brisbane suburb of Wacol. This facility currently provides employment, training and support for 221 people with a disability. The same year, Endeavour Foundation acquired Bay Support Services Group in Hervey Bay. When Bay Support Services went into voluntary liquidation, the Queensland Government asked Endeavour Foundation to take over the operations of the group, securing the support of 68 people with a disability and 230 staff positions.

2014 saw the amalgamation of Endeavour Foundation with supported employment service VATMI Group and also the Community Solutions Group of non-government organisations including TORGAS, Acclaim and Skills Plus/Brace. VATMI was the largest employer of people with a disability in Victoria, with four locations and various facilities in Kew, Keon Park, Bendigo, Wangaratta and Stawell. The merge with Community Solutions Group helped form Endeavour Foundation's Community Solutions Division; providing valued and complementary health and wellbeing, workforce (including apprenticeships), education and training services.

In 2017, Endeavour Foundation completed construction of the Kingaroy Kitchen Cafe. The addition of a cafe to the already successful commercial kitchen provides even more opportunities for people with a disability to develop skills working in hospitality and customer service.

The Endeavour Foundation of today is a diverse and embracing collection of like-minded businesses and communities from across the country. While much has changed over the last 66 years, the core objective and commitment of the organisation remains unchanged – to provide real possibilities and opportunities for people with a disability.

Services provided
In order to bring real possibilities to life, Endeavour Foundation's disability services are tailored around an individual's goals and aspirations. Endeavour Foundation currently supports more than 4,000 people to live fulfilling lives across 230 locations in Queensland, New South Wales and Victoria. Most service users are adults with Down syndrome, autism spectrum disorders, Fragile X syndrome and non-specific intellectual disabilities. Endeavour Foundation is the largest non-government provider of direct community services (to any group) in Australia.

Home & Daily Life
Endeavour Foundation provides people with disabilities better access to their communities and the chance to experience more in their daily lives through a range of housing and daily support services. With the aim of helping people transition to a more independent lifestyle, support is tailored to individual needs to allow customers to thrive. Living independently assists many people in achieving their goals, learning life skills and engaging in their community. Endeavour Foundation assists people in securing accommodation in either private or shared rented, public or private housing.

Work
As Australia's largest employer of people with a disability, Endeavour Foundation is experienced in providing supported employment and training focusing on what people can do, their strengths and capabilities. Endeavour Foundation supported workplaces are involved in the manufacture of industrial cleaning cloths, timber furniture and other wood products, mailing, collation and packing services (including food and pharmaceutical packaging), document destruction, e-recycling, industrial sewing, agriculture (nurseries, farms and orchards), as well as QArt – a professionally operated art studio for artists with a disability, with an accompanying retail gallery in Kew, Victoria – and Kingaroy Kitchen Fine Foods and Cafe, which sell a large range of delicious home-style jams, chutneys and biscuits. Endeavour Foundation also operates training organisations and employment agencies that offer specialised transition to work programs, work placements and apprenticeships.

Learning
Endeavour Foundation offers a range of learning and development opportunities that enable people with a disability to use their current knowledge and strengths to develop new skills. A tailored learning program can be developed with Endeavour Foundation to assist with a range of needs including: practical living skills to build confidence and self-esteem, learning or career plans depending on the person's aspirations, building knowledge or qualifications for meaningful employment and mentors to assist in transitioning through school, work and towards independent living.

Social & Community Participation
Endeavour Foundation offers opportunities for people interested in trying new activities, making new friends and increasing their participation in the community. Customers are able to participate in activities that they know they enjoy, or alternatively go outside of their comfort zone and try something new. The organisation has helped countless people with disabilities to join social groups or communal activities, learn how to use public transport or to drive a car, play musical instruments, sing in choirs, and even just attend regular community activities like sporting events or going to the movies. Endeavour Foundation supports people in whatever they would like to do.

Relationships & Independence
Endeavour Foundation provides a range of supports to enable people with disabilities to form positive relationships with friends, family and other important people in their lives. Communication skills including assistive technology, behavioural support to manage difficult emotions and behaviours and support groups are all available. All services are designed to allow customers to achieve greater independence, and choice and control over how they live their lives.

Shops and Products
Endeavour Foundation runs 26 recycled clothing stores in Queensland and New South Wales, known as Endo's, as well as an online eBay store. These stores sell new and recycled clothing, furniture, books, bedding and bric-a-brac.

Kingaroy Kitchen Fine Foods, which provides employment and training opportunities for 27 supported employees in the South Burnett region, produces hampers, preservative-free chutneys, marmalades, jams, biscuits and cakes available for purchase. The addition of a cafe in 2017 provides additional employment opportunities as well as the option for customers to dine-in and experience the Kingaroy Kitchen hospitality first-hand.

Endeavour Foundation has partnered with local Queensland councils to manage Tip Shops and Recycle Markets. There are currently ten Endeavour Foundation Tip Shops and Recycle Markets in Queensland that salvage and sell household items and furnishings, collectables, books and toys, and sporting equipment.

All funds raised through Endeavour Foundation's shops are reinvested into providing real possibilities for people with a disability. The stores also provide a valuable range of employment opportunities for people with a disability.

Fundraising
The Great Endeavour Rally is Endeavour Foundation's flagship annual fundraising event, which has been running for more than 30 years.

Endeavour Foundation is also well known for their prize home lotteries, which have been raising funds for the organisation for more than 40 years. Seven prize home lotteries and five Ultimate Life Changer lotteries are run each year.

All funds raised through lotteries and fundraising events go directly towards Endeavour Foundation's programs to support people with intellectual disability.

Criticism and controversy
Endeavour Foundation has been subject to some criticism for its large size, conservatism, and influence on government policy. Since 2000, the organisation has been shedding property assets and closing some services.

In 2000 and 2001, Endeavour Foundation attracted major controversy when it decided to cut case management services, with some staff discovering their positions had been made redundant through the press. In 2004, Endeavour Foundation was again subject to criticism for its decision to cut the Specialist Services team, an innovative service supporting staff to support service users with challenging (aggressive and assaultive) behaviour, only to announce in October 2005 that it would be reinstating the staff support service in a reduced form (though the employment of Disability Advisors) and combining abuse response and advocacy functions.

See also
 Social model of disability
 Social role valorization

References

Further reading

External links
 Official website
 'Disabled centres facing closure' 8 October 2004

Disability organisations based in Australia
Medical and health organisations based in Queensland
Disability rights organizations
Organizations established in 1951
1951 establishments in Australia
Queensland Greats